Súchil is a city and seat of the municipality of Súchil, in the state of Durango, north-western Mexico. As of 2010, the town of Súchil had a population of 4,107.

References

Populated places in Durango